Steve, Steven or Stephen Reed may refer to:
Stephen Reed (1801–1877), American newspaper publisher and geologist
Steven Reed (political scientist) (born 1947), professor of modern government at Chuo University
Stephen R. Reed (1949–2020), American politician, mayor of Harrisburg, Pennsylvania
Steve Reed (footballer, born 1956), English footballer
Steve Reed (soccer executive), president of the Canadian Soccer Association
Steve Reed (politician) (born 1963), British Labour politician, MP for Croydon North and former leader of Lambeth Council
Steve Reed (baseball) (born 1965), American baseball player
Steven Reed (mayor) (born 1973/74), former American judge and current Mayor of Montgomery, Alabama
Stephen Reed (footballer) (born 1985), English footballer

See also
Steve Reid (disambiguation)